The Ducati 1199 Panigale was a  Ducati sport bike introduced at the 2011 Milan Motorcycle Show. The motorcycle is named after the small manufacturing town of Borgo Panigale. Ducati had announced a larger displacement  1299 Panigale for the 2015 model year.

Specifications
Ducati said the 1199 had the highest power-to-weight and torque-to-weight ratios of production motorcycles.

Motorcycle Consumer News ranked the 2012 Panigale S with the best rear wheel horsepower to wet weight ratio, 1:2.47, of any bike the magazine had ever tested, as well as the 5th highest rear wheel horsepower, and the 10th highest top speed.

The new Superquadro engine is exceptionally oversquare, with a bore:stroke ratio of 1.84:1. Whereas previous Ducatis had belt-driven overhead cams, this engine's valvetrain uses gears and chain. The engine serves as a stressed member, making the Panigale smaller and lighter than a conventionally framed motorcycle.

The 1199 is also one of the first production sports motorcycles to feature electronically adjustable suspension. Rebound and compression damping is adjusted electronically while pre-load is still adjusted manually.
The 1199's exhaust system and mufflers are underneath the engine, and not beneath the seat as on previous models, such as the 1198 and 1098.

Panigale R

In 2012, Ducati added the Panigale R World Superbike homologation model for the 2013 model year.

The top speed of the Panigale R was estimated by Road & Track to be  with the track only Termignoni exhaust system it ships with, which they apparently derived from the speed at which the bike hits the rev limiter, assuming nominal gearing and wheel size.

Panigale S Senna
In 2013, Ducati again released a variant of their top of the range sportbike - this time the 1199 Panigale S Senna - dedicated to Formula 1 World Champion, Ayrton Senna. The predecessor was based on the 916 released in 1994; in both instances, net proceeds were donated to the Instituto Ayrton Senna charity.

1199 Superleggera
In 2014, Ducati launched the 1199 Superleggera. The philosophy behind this motorcycle was the largest reduction of weight possible, achieved through the use of exotic materials such as magnesium (particularly the monocoque frame), carbon and titanium. Only 500 were produced.

Racing
In the September 2012 Le Mans 24-Hours Motorcycle Endurance Race, a Team Scuderia Zone Rouge Ducati 1199 Panigale won the Open category, finishing 32nd overall. The riders were Stéphane Pagani, Phillipe Teissier and Hervé Royer.

Ducati finished second in the 2015 Superbike World Championship season, with Chaz Davies having 5 wins and finished second in the 2017 championship. Leandro Mercado won the riders title during the 2014 FIM Superstock 1000 Cup season. Ducati later took the manufacture title in 2016 and the rider title in 2017 with rider Michael Ruben Rinaldi.

Ducati won the British Superbike Championship in 2016 and 2017 with rider Shane "Shakey" Byrne, who rode for the factory supported PBM Be Wiser Ducati Team.

In road racing, Glen Irwin took his Panigale R to victory in 2017 at the North West 200 using the PBM Be Wiser Ducati.

Film
A purple 1199 Panigale was in the movie Kick-Ass 2, ridden by Hit-Girl.

See also
List of fastest production motorcycles by acceleration

References

External links

 

 
 
 

1199
Sport bikes
Motorcycles introduced in 2011